Things Take Time, Take Time is the third studio album by Australian singer-songwriter Courtney Barnett. It was released on 12 November 2021 by Milk! Records, Mom + Pop Music and Marathon Artists.

At the AIR Awards of 2022, the album was nominated for Independent Album of the Year and won Best Independent Rock Album or EP.

At the 2022 ARIA Music Awards, the album earned Barnett a nomination for ARIA Award for Best Solo Artist and album was nominated for Best Independent Release and Best Produced Album.

Recording and production
The album was recorded in Melbourne and Sydney from late 2020 to early 2021 with producer/drummer Stella Mozgawa. The Vinyl Factory called the album "a finely-woven collage of snapshots" and said it "dives into Barnett's own psyche to explore love, renewal, healing and self-discovering". The first single, "Rae Street", was released on 7 July 2021; the music video follows the residents of a suburban street, all of whom are played by Barnett. Later that day, Barnett released the 13-second non-album song "All Eyes on the Pavement" under the pseudonym Oliver Paul, the name of the protagonist of her 2015 song "Elevator Operator". The song was also released through a record label called A Crabby Mettle Neutron, an anagram of Barnett's full name.

The second single, "Before You Gotta Go", was released on 11 August; its music video was released on 13 September. The third single, "Write a List of Things to Look Forward to", was released with a music video on 29 September. "If I Don't Hear from You Tonight" was released on 9 November 2021, as the album's fourth single alongside 2022 Australian tour announcement.

Critical reception

At Metacritic, Things Take Time, Take Time holds a score of 79/100, indicating generally favourable reviews. El Hunt from NME said "Partly as a consequence of being written and recorded during the pandemic Things Take Time, Take Time is sparer than Barnett's previous records, pairing jangly, lackadaisical indie-rock with scatterings of drum machine; programmed in collaboration with Warpaint's Stella Mozgawa. Though it lacks the more immediate bite of Barnett's previous work, its softness gives it a more tender focus."

Accolades

"Write A List of Things To Look Forward To" was included on Barack Obama's list of his favorite songs of 2021.

Track listing

Personnel
Credits are adapted from the album's liner notes.

Musicians
 Courtney Barnett – vocals, guitars, strings, bass, piano, Omnichord, percussion, Wurlitzer; drums (track 10)
 Stella Mozgawa – drums, drum programming, percussion, bass, synths, vibraphone, Omnichord, sampler, tape delay; piano (track 10)
 Cate Le Bon – bass (track 7)
 Vagabon – vocals (track 10)
 Dave Mudie – vocals (track 6)
 Bones Sloane – vocals (track 6)
 Marek Mozgawa – handclaps (track 6)
 Chloe Dadd – handclaps (track 5)
 Simon Berckelman – tape delay (track 5)
 David Wrench – additional programming

Production
 Courtney Barnett – producer, artwork
 Stella Mozgawa – producer, assistant engineering
 Simon Berckelman – engineering
 Chloe Dadd – assistant engineering
 David Wrench – mixing
 Tim Pennells – assistant mixing
 Taylor Pollock – assistant mixing
 Grace Banks – assistant mixing
 Heba Kadry – mastering
 Danny Cohen – artwork photography
 Lily Paris West – artwork layout

Charts

References

2021 albums
Courtney Barnett albums
Matador Records albums
Marathon Artists albums